The East Timorese patrol boat Oecusse (P 101) is one of the two Albatroz class patrol boats operated by the Timor Leste Defence Force. She was built in the mid-1970s for the Portuguese Navy and was commissioned on 9 December 1974 as NRP Albatroz (P 1162). She was donated to East Timor in January 2002 and was renamed. Oecusse is based at Hera Naval Base.

References

 

Oecusse
Naval ships of Portugal
1974 ships